Beverly Glenn-Copeland (born 1944) is an American singer and songwriter. He has spent most of his life and career in Canada. His albums include Keyboard Fantasies (1986). Glenn-Copeland began publicly identifying as a trans man in 2002.

Early life 
Glenn-Copeland was born in Philadelphia, Pennsylvania to a musical family. As a child, Glenn-Copeland listened to his father play the music of Bach, Chopin, and Mozart on the piano, and heard his mother occasionally sing spirituals.

In 1961, Glenn-Copeland was one of the first black students to study at McGill University in Montreal.

In 1973, while in Los Angeles, Glenn fell in love with the chanting at a local Soka Gakkai International meeting and has been a practicing Buddhist since the mid-1970s.

Musical career 
Glenn-Copeland started his career as a folk singer incorporating jazz, classical, and blues elements. He also performed on albums by Ken Friesen, Bruce Cockburn, Gene Murtynec, Bob Disalle, and Kathryn Moses, and was a writer on Sesame Street. He spent twenty-five years entertaining children as a regular actor on Canadian children's television show Mr. Dressup.

Glenn-Copeland's 1986 electronic album Keyboard Fantasies, recorded using equipment including a Yamaha DX7 and a Roland TR-707, and other recordings were rediscovered and promoted by a Japanese collector  in 2015. Before Glenn-Copeland's gender transition was made public, "Keyboard Fantasies" was selected as one of the 70 greatest recordings by women by The Stranger. The album was named as the public vote winner of the Polaris Heritage Prize at the 2020 Polaris Music Prize. Keyboard Fantasies was remastered and reissued in February 2017 as Copeland Keyboard Fantasies by Invisible City Editions and re-released again on vinyl that same year on Séance Centre.

Other albums by Glenn-Copeland include Beverly Glenn Copeland (1970), Beverly Copeland (early 1970s), At Last! (1980), Primal Prayer (released under the pseudonym Phynix in 2004), and Transmissions (released in September 2020).

Keyboard Fantasies: The Beverly Glenn-Copeland Story, a documentary directed by Posy Dixon, was released in 2019.

Planned 2020 international tours to Australia, the United Kingdom, and other European destinations were rescheduled to 2021 due to the COVID-19 pandemic. A fundraising campaign was initiated to help Glenn-Copeland and his wife after the loss of their house that resulted from these changes; the campaign raised over $90,000. In the same year, Glenn-Copeland created a prerecorded video performance of his song "Courage" for Buddies in Bad Times and CBC Gem's online Queer Pride Inside show.

Discography

Albums
Beverly Glenn Copeland (1970)
Beverly Copeland (early 1970s)
At Last! (1980)
Keyboard Fantasies (1986)
Copeland Keyboard Fantasies (Invisible City, 2017) – remastered and reissued edition
Copeland Keyboard Fantasies (Séance Centre, 2017) – on vinyl
Primal Prayer (2004) – released under the pseudonym Phynix
Transmissions (2020)

Other albums
Keyboard Fantasies Reimagined (Transgressive, 2021) – Keyboard Fantasies tracks remixed/reworked by Bon Iver and Flock Of Dimes, and by Joseph Shabason and Thom Gill; remixed by Julia Holter, Arca, Ana Roxanne, Kelsey Lu, and Blood Orange; and performed by Jeremy Dutcher

Films
Keyboard Fantasies: The Beverly Glenn-Copeland Story (2019) – documentary directed by Posy Dixon

References

Further reading
 Honored onscreen and in sound, Beverly Glenn-Copeland, a messenger whose time is now. McCabe, Allyson, November 29, 2021 NPR

External links
 

Living people
American emigrants to Canada
Canadian male singer-songwriters
Canadian singer-songwriters
Canadian LGBT singers
Musicians from Philadelphia
New-age musicians
Transgender male musicians
Transgender singers
Feminist musicians
Black Canadian LGBT people
LGBT African Americans
American LGBT singers
LGBT people from Pennsylvania
1944 births
21st-century Canadian LGBT people